Ken Parker is a fictional character from a series of eponym Italian comics created in 1974  by Giancarlo Berardi and Ivo Milazzo. He is a widely appreciated character in Italy and all over former Yugoslavia.

First issue of the series, "Lungo fucile" ("long rifle") was published by the Italian publisher CEPIM. Ken Parker, however, had been created three years earlier on a magazine of the same publisher. The series ran for 59 numbers. New issues appeared in the following years, and are constantly under reprint in Italy.

Ken Parker is a western anti-hero, graphically inspired by Robert Redford of Jeremiah Johnson. Like Johnson, he is a trapper who had decided to escape from the first city to have appeared in the United States. His stories are mainly set in Northwestern states or, after Parker was forced to flee after his participation in some strikes in Boston (initially as a Pinkerton agent), along the Canadian frontier.

The themes dealt by the series are unusual for a western, including homosexuality, ecology, ghettoization, justice, the destiny of Man, and his relationship with God. Ken Parker is not a typical cowboy, a monolithic character like Tex Willer or John Wayne's heroes: he grows older since his first story (set in 1870) he commits errors and changes his ideas and ideals. He maintained: "I don't like to kill... not even when it is necessary".

Ken Parker regular publication ceased, but is still occasionally published by Sergio Bonelli Editore and Panini Comics.

References

Sources
Franco Fossati, I grandi eroi del fumetto, Gramese, 1990, pp. 131–132
 Domenico Denaro, La storia di Ken Parker, L'Arca Perduta, 1987
 Gianni Di Pietro, Ken Parker, il respiro del sogno, Del Grifo, 1989

External links
Website Ken Parker on TexBR 

Italian comics
Ken Parker
Western (genre) comics characters
Italian comics characters
Ken Parker
Comics characters introduced in 1974
Ken Parker